Alderman Sir Richard Stephenson Harper, JP (30 December 1902 – 16 November 1973) was an English local politician.

Biography 
Harper was born on 30 December 1902, the only son of Alderman Richard S. Harper, JP, of Harnham House, Slade Lane, Manchester, and his wife, Edith C. Harper, also a JP. The family had a long tradition of public service in Manchester, one of his ancestors being a founder of Manchester and Salford Co-operatve Society, while his grandfather was secretary of the Cobden Liberal Club in Lower Broughton and his father was a long-serving member of Manchester City Council. He attended Manchester and Chorlton-cum-Hardy Grammar Schools, before studying at Bonar Law College in Hertfordshire.

In business, he worked in electrical and general engineering from 1920 to 1925 (he was later director of the Manchester Ship Canal Company), when he became Private Secretary to his father. In 1932, he was elected onto Manchester City Council, serving until 1951, when he was elevated to the Aldermanic bench. He was Lord Mayor for the year 1954–55 and led the Conservative Group on the Council for eight years. He also contested the Exchange seat for the Conservatives in the 1950 general election and was a justice of the peace for Manchester from 1949. According to The Guardian, Harper was "an expert on local government and housing". He was knighted in 1958 and was made an honorary freeman of Manchester in 1973. He died on 16 November 1973, leaving a son and a widow, his wife Lily, the only daughter of Nathaniel and Elizabeth Walker of Manchester.

References 

1902 births
1973 deaths
Knights Bachelor
People from Longsight
English justices of the peace
Politicians from Manchester
Mayors of Manchester